The Dubai International Holy Quran Award is an annual award given for memorization of the Qur'an sponsored by the government of Dubai. It has given hundreds of awards to people who have excelled in the memorization of the Quran, and international award people from all over the world can participate in it.

See also
 Muhammad VI Awards for the Holy Quran
 List of religion-related awards

External links

 Dubai International Holy Quran Award website
 Dubai International Holy Quran Award website 

Islamic awards
Islam in the United Arab Emirates
Religion in Dubai
Annual events in the United Arab Emirates
Emirati awards
Quran reciting